"Mama Told Me" is a song by American rapper Big Boi featuring singer Kelly Rowland, taken from his second studio album Vicious Lies and Dangerous Rumors (2012). Co-written by Swedish synth-pop group Little Dragon, who appeared on the original version of the song, it is a 1980s electro funk record that serves as an ode to Big Boi's mother. Production on the song was handled by The Flush, while co-production was handled by Chris Carmouche and Big Boi. Released as the album's lead single, it failed to chart or sell noticeably but reached number eight on the German Black Chart. It is also featured on the soundtrack of the video game MLB 13: The Show.

Background 
"Mama Told Me" was produced by The Flush, while co-production was handled by Chris Carmouche and Big Boi. The song originally featured Swedish synth-pop group Little Dragon, who co-wrote the song along with Big Boi and premiered the song with him in Austin, Texas, at an event hosted by Vitaminwater and The Fader in August 2012. Though Little Dragon's version was set to appear on the rapper's second solo album, the band was not featured on the final version due to "business terms out of our control". They were eventually replaced by American singer Kelly Rowland on the hook and bridge. On the concept of the 1980s electro funk record, Big Boi stated that "the song was basically an ode to my mom, just a lot of stuff she taught me coming up that made me the man I am today." The Linn Drum beat is a sample from Prince's 1982 track "Automatic."

Music video 
An accompanying music video, directed by Syndrome, was shot in Los Angeles, California against a green screen. It depicts Big Boi and Rowland in "a surreal fantasy land." The music video was released on November 21, 2012.

Track listing 
Digital download
"Mama Told Me" – 3:12

Charts 
The song peaked at number 8 on the German Black Chart during the week of January 11, 2013.

References 

2012 singles
Big Boi songs
Kelly Rowland songs
Songs written by Big Boi
2012 songs